Mary Frampton may refer to:

Mary Featherstonhaugh Frampton (1928–2014) British civil servant
Mary Frampton (1773–1846) British writer
Mary Nogueras Frampton (1930–2006) American photographer